The rhombus of Michaelis, also known as the Michaelis-Raute or the quadrilateral of Michaelis, is a rhombus-shaped contour (also referred to as kite-shaped or diamond shaped) that is sometimes visible on the lower human back. The rhombus is defined by the following vertices: Dimples of Venus, the top of the gluteal crease and the lower end of the crease over the spine.

The Rhombus of Michaelis is named after Gustav Adolf Michaelis, a 19th-century German obstetrician.

References

Sources

See also
 Dimples of Venus

External links
 Discussion of Rhombus of Michaelis in childbirth. Accessed 2012-11-10. 
 Parts of this article are based on a translation of the equivalent article from the German Wikipedia.
 Biography of Gustav Adolf Michaelis

Human anatomy
Anatomy named for one who described it